Alfred Pearson may refer to:

 Alfred Pearson (bishop) (1848–1909), Bishop of Burnley, 1905–1909
 Alfred Pearson (politician) (1850–1921), entrepreneur and politician, mayor of Winnipeg
 Alfred Astley Pearson (1850–1937), British Indian Army officer
 Alfred Chilton Pearson (1861–1935), English classical scholar
 Alfred J. Pearson (1869–1939), American diplomat
 Alfred L. Pearson (1838–1903), lawyer and Union Army general in the American Civil War